In the scientific discipline of economics, the Econometric Society is a learned society devoted to the advancement of economics by using mathematical and statistical methods. This article is a list of its (past and present) presidents.

List 

2022: Guido Tabellini
2021: Pinelopi Koujianou Goldberg
2020: Orazio Attanasio
2019: Stephen Morris
2018: Tim Besley
2017: Drew Fudenberg
2016: Eddie Dekel
2015: Robert Porter
2014: Manuel Arellano
2013: James J. Heckman
2012: Jean-Charles Rochet
2011: Bengt R. Holmström
2010: John Hardman Moore
2009: Roger B. Myerson
2008: Torsten Persson
2007: Lars Peter Hansen
2006: Richard Blundell
2005: Thomas J. Sargent
2004: Ariel Rubinstein
2003: Eric Maskin
2002: 
2001: Avinash Dixit
2000: Elhanan Helpman
1999: Robert B. Wilson
1998: Jean Tirole
1997: Robert E. Lucas, Jr.
1996: Roger Guesnerie
1995: Christopher Sims
1994: Takashi Negishi
1993: Andreu Mas-Colell
1992: Jean-Jacques Laffont
1991: Peter A. Diamond
1990: 
1989: Hugo F. Sonnenschein
1988: Anthony B. Atkinson
1987: Dale Jorgenson
1986: Michael Bruno
1985: Daniel McFadden
1984: Amartya K. Sen
1983: Herbert Scarf
1982: James A. Mirrlees
1981: Marc Nerlove
1980: John D. Sargan
1979: Franklin M. Fisher
1978: János Kornai
1977: Lionel McKenzie
1976: Hirofumi Uzawa
1975: Zvi Griliches
1974: Don Patinkin
1973: Roy Radner
1972: W. M. Gorman
1971: Gérard Debreu
1970: Jacques H. Drèze
1969: Leonid Hurwicz
1968: Frank Hahn
1967: Hendrik Houthakker
1966: Herman Wold
1965: Michio Morishima
1964: Robert Solow
1963: Edmond Malinvaud
1962: Franco Modigliani
1961: Henri Theil
1960: Lawrence Klein
1959: Marcel Boiteux
1958: James Tobin
1957: Trygve Haavelmo
1956: Kenneth Arrow
1955: Richard Stone
1954: Wassily Leontief
1953: René Roy
1952: Paul Samuelson
1951: R. G. D. Allen
1950: Tjalling Koopmans
1949: Ragnar Frisch
1948: Charles Roos
1947: Jan Tinbergen
1946: Jacob Marschak
1944–1945: John Maynard Keynes
1942–1943: Wesley Mitchell
1940–1941: Joseph Schumpeter
1938–1939: Arthur Bowley
1936–1937: Harold Hotelling
1935: François Divisia
1931–1934: Irving Fisher

References 

 
 
Econometric Society
Econometric Society
Econometric Society
Econometric Society